Rio Heroes is a Brazilian drama television series created by Fabio Danesi, Camila Raffanti and Alexandre Soares Silva, and produced by Mixer Films, NBCUniversal and Fox Networks Group: the 1st season premiered on Fox Premium on February 24, 2018, and the 2nd season premiered on May 10, 2019.

The series is based on a wrestling championship that actually existed between the years 2007 and 2009 and which became known for its extremely crude and violent nature. Starring Murilo Rosa in the lead role, Rio Heroes follows the story of Jorge Pereira, a jiu-jitsu athlete who did not conform to the increasing limitations imposed by wrestling federations that prevented the execution of certain blows and forced the use of gloves.

Premise 
The series is based on the real story of the Brazilian wrestler Jorge Pereira, who decided to create a Vale tudo championship.

Cast
 Murilo Rosa	as	 Jorge Pereira
 Juliana Araripe	as	 Carol
 Bruno Bellarmino	as	 Jair Cabeçada
 Roney Facchini	as	 Rogério
 Priscila Fantin	as	 Claudinha Pitbull
 Giovanni Gallo	as	 Max Werneck
 Luiz Guilherme	as	 Mestre Galdino
 Ronny Kriwat	as	 Pipo
 Rafael Losso	as	 Eric
 Miguel Nader	as	 Goya
 Duda Nagle	as	 Rogerinho
 André Ramiro  as       Basilio

References

External links
 

2018 Brazilian television series debuts
2010s Brazilian television series
Brazilian action television series
Brazilian drama television series
Portuguese-language television shows
Television series based on actual events